Robert Fischer is the name of:

Robert Fischer (unionist) (1883–1945), German unionist and social democratic politician
Robert Fischer (politician) (1937–2020), Canadian politician, member of the Legislative Assembly of Alberta
Bobby Fischer (1943–2008), American chess grandmaster and chess world champion between 1972 and 1975
Robert Fischer (actor) (1881–1973), German actor featured in The Wiser Sex, Zaza and They Raid by Night
Robert Fischer (author) (born 1960), German author, see Bernhard Wicki
Robert Fischer (football) (fl. 1930s), Austrian football manager of RC Strasbourg and Racing Club de Paris
Robert L. Fischer (molecular biologist), Professor Emeritus in Plant and Microbial Biology at the University of California, Berkeley
Robert Fischer (judge) (1911–1983), German judge, president of the Federal Court of Justice of Germany from 1968 till 1977
Robert Fischer (rugby player), German rugby player, see 2008–09 Rugby-Bundesliga squads
Robert Fischer (soldier), German soldier awarded the Knight's Cross of the Iron Cross
Robert Fischer, character in the film Inception

See also 
Robert Fisher (disambiguation)
Bob Fisher (disambiguation)